Johann Heinrich Schönfeld (1609–1684) was a German painter in the Baroque style.

Biography
He was the son of Johann Baptist Schönfeld (?-1635); a goldsmith. From birth, he was blind in his left eye and could only use his right hand for simple tasks, so he was not trained as a goldsmith, as would have otherwise been the case. Later, he took study trips to Stuttgart and Basel.

In 1633, at the height of the Thirty Years' War, he fled to Italy. Originally, he lived in Rome, then moved to Naples around 1649. After a brief stay in Dresden he returned home in 1651. The following year, in Pfuhl (near Ulm) he married Anna Elisabetha Strauß. They had eight children together. Shortly after their marriage, they moved to Augsburg, where he became a citizen and a member of the Master's Guild.

In the following years, he created many church paintings; notably at Würzburg Cathedral, where he painted Christ carrying the Cross and a likeness of Saint Leonard of Noblac. Both paintings burned during the bombing of Würzburg in World War II. In addition to religious works, he painted mythological and genre scenes.

One of his best-known students was Johann Schmidtner.

References

Further reading
 Herbert Pée: Johann Heinrich Schönfeld. Bilder, Zeichnungen, Graphik. Museum Ulm, Ulm 1967 (Exhibition catalog, Ulm, Museum Ulm, 2. July – 17. September 1967).
 Ursula Zeller (Ed.): Johann Heinrich Schönfeld – Welt der Götter, Heiligen und Heldenmythen. DuMont, Köln 2009,  (Exhibition catalog, Friedrichshafen, Zeppelin Museum, 16. October 2009 – 7. February 2010).
 Christof Trepesch (Ed.): Maler von Welt. Johann Heinrich Schönfeld im Bestand der Kunstsammlungen und Museen Augsburg. Deutscher Kunstverlag, Berlin 2010,  (Exhibition catalog, Augsburg, Schaezlerpalais, 10. July – 17. October 2010).

External links

 
 
 
 
 Biography @ the Augsburger-Gedenktage

1609 births
1684 deaths
People from Biberach an der Riss
17th-century German painters
German male painters
Baroque painters